La Laura-Malenga is a village in the Moka District in Mauritius. The population was 1,230 in 2000 and is estimated to be 1,336 as of 2012. The village got its name "La Laura-Malenga" in 1859. The name came from a 19th-century sugar estate. Le Pouce, the third-highest mountain in Mauritius, is close to this village.

See also
 List of places in Mauritius

References

Moka District
Populated places in Mauritius